Tustenuggee is a surname of Seminole origin. Notable people with the surname include:

 Halleck Tustenuggee ( 1807–?), Seminole leader
 Thlocklo Tustenuggee (19th century), Seminole leader

Native American surnames